Garry McCoy (born 18 April 1972 in Sydney, New South Wales) is an Australian former professional motorcycle racer. He has won races in the 125 cc and 500 cc World Championships, as well as in the Superbike World Championship. He is noted for his oversteering style of riding, earning him the nickname "The Slide King".

Career 
McCoy was born in Sydney and in his late teens was a motorcycle speedway rider in his home state of New South Wales, racing alongside such riders as Todd Wiltshire and Craig Boyce. McCoy mostly rode in Division 2 races at tracks like the now closed Newcastle Motordrome. He finished second in the NSW Div 2 championship in November 1990.

He raced in his first 125 cc world championship races in 1992, only four months after his first road race of any kind. He entered the full season the year after, though he missed races through injury in both 1993 and 1994. He won the 1995 Malaysian Grand Prix and the Australian Grand Prix as well as 7 other top-3 finishes and one pole position. In 1996 he signed to privateer Team Bramich and rode a 748s Ducati. It was a great year for McCoy as he learnt from team director, Don Bramich, the fundamentals for managing a successful team.

In 1998 he joined the Hardwick Racing Shell Advance Honda team to compete in the premier 500 cc class for the first time, riding a NSR500. He scored points in six of the nine races he started before a broken ankle ended his season. He was out of a ride at the start of 1999, and considered returning to cabinet-making, but he joined WCM mid-season, and finished third at Valencia Grand Prix, though his best result elsewhere was seventh.

2000 was a breakout season for Garry with WCM, as he opened the year with a shock win at the South African Grand Prix at Welkom. He had been the only rider to get the 16'5-inch Michelin tyre working to full effect, with his sideways riding style and slight build ideally suited to it. There were two further wins that year at Portugal and Valencia (his Valencia victory was the most recent win for a non-Honda satellite bike until Fabio Quartararo's victory at Jerez in 2020) to help secure a fifth-place finish in the 500 championship. 2001 was ruined by a broken wrist sustained at the French Grand Prix, and 2002 was not a huge success either, resulting in him joining Kawasaki's factory team. This was hugely disappointing; McCoy only scored points three times, and he and teammates Andrew Pitt and Alex Hofmann rarely qualified in the top 15.

For  he joined NCR Ducati in the Superbike World Championship, winning at Philip Island and finishing 6th overall. After 9 rounds his best finish was 12th, and he has qualified for Superpole and a top-16 starting spot 4 times. Results did not improve, and he had no road racing ride for 2006, instead contesting some Supercross.

McCoy worked as a test rider for Ilmor's 2007 Ilmor X3 800 cc MotoGP prototype, competing in the final two rounds of the 2006 MotoGP season as a wildcard.  He was expected to ride for Ilmor in 2007, but Andrew Pitt and an injured, 42-year-old Jeremy McWilliams were chosen instead.

In 2008 McCoy joined Triumph's new Supersport World Championship campaign on the Daytona 675 bike. He failed to finish the first race in Losail due to a mechanical failure. He finished 6th in the Philip Island race and retired from the Valencia race. A huge crash at Brno when he struck the slowing bike of one-time teammate Andrew Pitt threatened to end his season

In 2009 at the Donington circuit McCoy scored the first podium for Triumph with 3rd place. He was back on the podium with another third at the WSS final round for 2009 in Portimao, Portugal, finishing the season 8th overall.

Initial expectations were that McCoy would continue with the team for the 2010 season, however he was not a part of the four-rider lineup. The team stated that he had left by 'mutual consent', however McCoy denied this and claimed that the departure was news to him

In 2010 McCoy was set to make his return to MotoGP with the FB Corse Team with a two-year deal that would have marked his 18 years in competition. However the team failed to get its three-cylinder 800cc project into competitive shape and on 7 June 2010 McCoy announced their contract had been terminated by mutual consent.

Career statistics

Grand Prix motorcycle racing
All stats according to MotoGP.com

By season

Races by year
(key) (Races in bold indicate pole position; races in italics indicate fastest lap)

References

External links 

 garrymccoy.tv – Official website

1972 births
Living people
Australian motorcycle racers
Kawasaki Motors Racing MotoGP riders
Superbike World Championship riders
Supersport World Championship riders
Motorcycle racers from Sydney
MotoGP World Championship riders